Andrees Allgemeiner Handatlas was a major cartographic work (general atlas) published in several German and foreign editions 1881–1937. It was named after Richard Andree (1835–1912) and published by Velhagen & Klasing, Bielefeld and Leipzig, Germany.

By using chromolithography, rather than copper plate engraving, but reproducing the maps from zinc plates that were etched in relief (just like letterpress printing), V & K was able to offer detailed maps at a much lower price than competing works, such as the 7th and 8th editions of Stielers Handatlas. The 1937 edition of Andrees Handatlas was printed using offset printing.

Editions
The first edition appeared in 1881. The 4th and 5th editions were edited by Carl Paul Albert (1851-1912); the 6th through 8th editions, by Ernst Ambrosius; and the final edition, by Konrad Frenzel. Cartographers were G. Jungk (†1932), R. Kocher, E. Umbreit (†1904), T. Adolph (†1930), H. Mielisch (†1925), and K. Tänzler (†1944) although production of a number of maps was contracted out to geographical institutes like Peip, Wagner & Debes, Sternkopf, Sulzer.

Editions for other countries were also issued:
Österreichisch-Ungarischer (Austrian-Hungarian) editions were published in Vienna in 1881, 1889, 1893, 1903, and 1913.
Four editions of Andree's Stora Handatlas were published in Stockholm (1881, 96 pages of maps; 1899, second edition, 130 large maps and 140 inset maps; 1907, third edition, 143 large maps and 163 inset maps), with additional maps of Scandinavia; and 1924. The verso text and the introductory material was in Swedish.
The maps of Andree's atlas were used for Cassell's Universal Atlas, which was published in London in 1891-1893 using maps printed in Leipzig in English; and for the Times Atlas of 1895-1900.
French editions were published from 1882 onwards.
Italian editions were published in 1899 and 1915.
Danish editions were published in 1882 and, after the Schleswig plebiscite, 1923.
Norwegian editions were published in 1882 and 1923.
A Finnish edition was published in 1899.

Editions of a Geographisches Handbuch (Geographical Handbook) for Andrees Handatlas were issued in 1882, 1894 (1st edition), 1895 (2nd edition), 1898-1899 (3rd), 1902 (4th) and 1909 (5th).

Other well-known titles of Velhagen & Klasing were Putzgers (after F.W. Putzger, †1913) Historischer Schulatlas (Historical School Atlas; 1877, as Historischer Weltatlas or Historical Worldatlas; 100th ed. 1979), Grosser Volksatlas (Large Peoples Atlas, 1935) and Grosser Wehratlas (Large Military Atlas, 1937). Founded 1835, the firm was taken over by F. Cornelsen in 1954, and is now fully merged into that company.

References

External links

 Karlsruhrer Virtueller Katalog

1881 non-fiction books
Atlases